Possessed (猛鬼出籠) is a 1983 Hong Kong film directed by David Lai.  It is followed by Possessed II in 1984.

Plot
An insane man is shot dead by two cops Kung and Hsiao after he refused to listen to them and stabbed a woman dead. After that, the two cops always meet strange things and Hsiao's girl friend is also haunted too. In order to reduce the fear, the cops employ a Taoist to find out the problem.  After several enchantments, the Taoist discovers the truth: As Hsiao's father was involved in some corruption that led to a death. Now the spirit of the victim has returned from hell for revenge.

Cast
Siu Yuk-Lung (1) – Siu Yuk Lung
Lau Siu-Ming – Lau Siu Ming
Irene Wan Pik-Ha – Siu's sister
Tai San (1) – Leong Hsia
Chan Chi-Shui – Sue
Wong Yat-Fei – Master Chen
Sham Ching-Mei – Lin Chin Shui's mother
San Sin – Priest
Chan Wai-Yue – Wang Tso Yi's wife
Chan Fung-Bing – Auntie San
Chui Yi – Hsiao Yau Tim
Lee Wan (2) – Ms Hung
Kobe Wong Kam-Bo – Priest
Ng Kit-Keung – Wang Tso Yi
Law Man-Hon – Ming's superior officer
John Chan – Boyfriend of Siu's sister

References

External links
 

Hong Kong horror films
1983 films
Films directed by David Lai
Hong Kong supernatural horror films
1980s Hong Kong films